A joint replacement registry is a system of collecting information of arthroplasty outcomes at a population (often national) level, in order to provide an evidence-base for safe and effective treatment options.

Background

The UK registry, the NJR, was set up as recommendation of a Royal College of Surgeons of England review into the high-profile failure of the 3M Capital Hip.

Information collected

Registers collect information on a combination of hip replacements, knee replacements (both total and unicompartmental), shoulder replacements, ankle replacements and elbow replacements.  Some countries exclude hemiarthroplasties done for traumatic hip fractures.

Initially designed only to record surgeon and implant performance, the main outcome collected was implant failure, however recently patient-reported outcome measures are being added.

Research

Given the amount of information stored, the data from many of the registries is used as the basis of scientific papers, for example on the metal-on-metal hip controversy.

Worldwide registries

There are currently 31 national members of the International Society of Arthroplasty Registers (ISAR).  In addition, in the United States, there are 10 regional or private registries collecting data.

References

Orthopaedic registries